The Tekirdağ Subregion (Turkish: Tekirdağ Alt Bölgesi) (TR21) is a statistical subregion in Turkey.

Provinces 

 Tekirdağ Province (TR211)
 Edirne Province (TR212)
 Kırklareli Province (TR213)

See also 

 NUTS of Turkey

External links 
 TURKSTAT

Sources 
 ESPON Database

Statistical subregions of Turkey